Palatinate-Neumarkt (German: Pfalz-Neumarkt) was a subdivision of the Wittelsbach dynasty of the German Electoral Palatinate. Its capital was Neumarkt in der Oberpfalz.

First creation 
This line divided after the death of Rupert of Germany in the year 1410 into four lines: Palatinate-Neumarkt, Palatinate-Simmern, Palatinate-Mosbach, and the electoral line with the capital in Heidelberg.

Palatinate-Neumarkt prospered under Rupert's son John (1383–1443). From his marriage with Catherine of Pomerania-Stolp, Christopher of Bavaria (1416–1448) was born, who governed the Kalmar union (Denmark, Sweden, and Norway).

With Christopher's death, Palatinate-Neumarkt line expired, and its possessions fell to the line Palatinate-Mosbach, which became Palatinate-Mosbach-Neumarkt.

Second creation 

In 1524, a new apanage named Palatinate-Neumarkt was created for Wolfgang.  When he died in 1558, it fell back to the Electoral Palatinate.

 
Counties of the Holy Roman Empire
History of the Palatinate (region)